The Joseph Loth Company Building is a historic industrial building at 25 Grand Street in Norwalk, Connecticut.  It is a two-story brick Romanesque Revival structure with a four-story clock tower.  The rear of the building has been altered by the addition of modern concrete sections in the 1950s.  Built in 1903, it is a well-preserved example of industrial architecture of the period, and is a local landmark.

The building was listed on the National Register of Historic Places on May 17, 1984.

See also
National Register of Historic Places listings in Fairfield County, Connecticut

References

National Register of Historic Places in Fairfield County, Connecticut
Buildings and structures completed in 1903
Buildings and structures in Norwalk, Connecticut